List of rivers flowing in the province of East Java, Indonesia:

In alphabetical order

See also 
 List of rivers of Indonesia
 List of rivers of Java

References 

 
East Java